The National Forestry Rally, Motorsport Ireland National Forest Rally is a rallying series in the Republic of Ireland. It consists series of events, organized by a different motor club representing the region.

The championship is regulated by Motorsport Ireland who are the governing body of Motorsports in the Republic of Ireland.

Seasons

2022
With COVID-19 restrictions effectively being lifted, full event calendar has been announced. Killarney Forestry Rally returned to the calendar after 15 years. Midland Forest Rally is scheduled for a debut, and the round 7 details are yet to be announced. Limerick Forest Rally, Lakeland Stages Rally and Sean Conlon Memorial Forestry Rally have been dropped this year.

Round 1 of the event was stopped after rally driver Eoin McCarthy crashed heavily on stage 4. The competitor was transferred to the hospital, where he died from his injuries. His co-driver Daniel O'Brien only suffered minor injuries.

Round 3 of the event was cancelled 16 days before the rally as the organizers lost access and use of tracks of up to 1/3 of the rally mileage.

Results

2021
COVID-19 pandemic continued into 2021, and all motorsports events remained suspended. The Irish Forest Rally Championship was by default cancelled, although no announcement was made. As the vaccinations were progressing, at the end of May Motorsport Ireland announced that motorsports events can resume from 7 June, subject to local restrictions. There was no championship, but some of the Irish Forest Rally event dates were announced. Bushwhacker Rally and Lakeland Stages Rally were also announced by Northern Ireland's motor clubs.

2020
The 2020 calendar included two changes, round 4 Cavan Forest Rally has been dropped in favor of Sean Conlon Memorial Forestry Rally, and round 7 Lakeland Stages Rally replaced by Bushwhacker Rally.

The Moonraker Forest Rally was initially scheduled 18 April, but later rescheduled to 28 March. Limerick Forest Rally on 1 March was postponed on the day due to snowfall, the new date proposed is 18–19 April.

On 12 March all motorsports events were postponed in the light of the coronavirus pandemic. 
On 20 March, Motorsport Ireland issued a statement that all motorsport events are suspended until 1 June 2020. After the government released a road map on easing the COVID-19 restrictions on 6 May, Motorsport Ireland released a statement same day that in line with Phase 4 of this road map the suspension of all motor sports events is extended until the 20 July 2020. Rally events fall under Phase 5 of the guidelines and will not be considered until after the 10 August 2020. On 19 May Motorsport Ireland cancelled the 2020 championship. Clubs might still be able to run events if they wish but it won't hold championship status.

Only the round 1 took place before rounds 2-6 were postponed, and eventually all remaining rounds were cancelled.

2019
The calendar consisted of seven events, with a reserve Bushwhacker Rally on 21 September, which ended up not being included as a championship round.

The overall champion:  Cathan McCourt, Ford Fiesta R5

Top 10 drivers overall:

2018
The calendar consisted of seven events. Round 4 was pushed forward by two weeks.

The overall champion:  Josh Moffet, Ford Fiesta R5

Top 10 drivers overall:

 Note: # - did not start

2017
The calendar originally consisted of seven events, however round 2 was cancelled. The best 5 results counted towards championship points.

The overall champion:  Sam Moffet, Ford Fiesta WRC

Top 10 drivers overall:

 Note: # - did not start

Sponsors 
The main event sponsors are the Coillte - the national forestry company, and Valvoline - the overall title sponsor.

Broadcasting
The TV coverage is captured by On the Limit Sports. The viewers can view the series on TG4 and RTE Player in Ireland, as well as on satellite channel and Motorsport.tv.

References

External links 
 Irish Forest Rally Championship website

Rally racing series
Rally competitions in Ireland